"I Fell In Love" is the debut single by American freestyle recording artist Rockell. It was the first single off Rockell's 1998 debut album, What Are You Lookin' At?. In the United States, the song achieved moderate success, peaking at #61. In Canada, the song did better reaching #8 on the Canadian Singles Chart.

Lyrics and background
The song describes a broken romance. She falls in love and gives her heart only to be hurt as the guy walks out of her life. She says she does not need his love anymore and is glad to be free. The song has a night club rhythm with a classic freestyle beat.

Track listing
US CD single

Chart positions

Year-end charts

References

Rockell songs
1996 debut singles
1996 songs